Nick Lane (born 1967) is a British biochemist and writer. He is a professor in evolutionary biochemistry at University College London. He has published five books to date which have won several awards.

Career
Educated at Imperial College, London, he earned his PhD at the Royal Free Hospital Medical School in 1995 with a thesis entitled In vivo studies of ischaemia-reperfusion injury in hypothermically stored rabbit renal autograft. He then worked as Medical Writer at Oxford Clinical Communications for a year before joining Medi Cine International a medical multimedia company, also as a writer. In 1999 he became strategic director at what was, by then, Adelphi Medi Cine, a post he held until 2002.

He became an Honorary Researcher at University College London in 1997, has held the post of Honorary Reader since 2006 and was the first Provost's Venture Research Fellow there from 2009 to 2012. Since October 2013 he has been Reader in Evolutionary Biochemistry in the Department of Genetics, Evolution and Environment at UCL. He is the author of popular science books and many articles and is the winner of the 2015 Biochemical Society Award and the 2016 Michael Faraday Prize.

Publications 

His book, Life Ascending: The Ten Great Inventions of Evolution, won the 2010 Royal Society Prize for Science Books. He appeared on In Our Time on Radio Four on 13 September 2012, when the topic of discussion was the cell, and again on 15 May 2014, when the topic was photosynthesis.

Books

Selected articles

References

External links 

 

British science writers
Academics of University College London
Alumni of the UCL Medical School
Alumni of Imperial College London
Living people
1967 births
British biochemists